Davor Štefanek (born 12 September 1985) is a Serbian representative in Greco-Roman Wrestling, he was the 2014 World champion and the 2016 Olympic champion in the Greco-Roman 66 kg category.

Biography
At the Mediterranean Games, he has won two silver medals at the 2005 and 2018 renditions as well as a gold medal in 2009. At the European Wrestling Championships, he has won three silver and two bronze medals. At the World Wrestling Championships, he won a gold medal in 2014, silver medal in 2018, and bronze medal in 2015.

Štefanek represented Serbia and Montenegro at the 2004 Summer Olympics in Athens, as well as Serbia at the 2008 Summer Olympics in Beijing and 2016 Summer Olympics in Rio de Janeiro, where he won the gold medal in the 66kg event. Štefanek was the first Serbian athlete to win a medal in Rio de Janeiro after 11 days of disappointing results and was credited by other Serbian athletes for raising their spirits.  The Serbian team then proceeded to win 7 more medals in the following days, making the 2016 Olympic Games edition by far the most successful in Serbia's history as an independent nation until that point.

He was awarded the golden Medal for Merits by the Republic of Serbia in 2019.

References

External links

list of Davor's medal at the official site of European wrestling championship 2012

1985 births
Living people
Serbian male sport wrestlers
Olympic wrestlers of Serbia
Olympic wrestlers of Serbia and Montenegro
Wrestlers at the 2004 Summer Olympics
Wrestlers at the 2008 Summer Olympics
Wrestlers at the 2016 Summer Olympics
Sportspeople from Subotica
World Wrestling Championships medalists
Olympic medalists in wrestling
Medalists at the 2016 Summer Olympics
Olympic gold medalists for Serbia
Mediterranean Games gold medalists for Serbia
Mediterranean Games silver medalists for Serbia
Competitors at the 2005 Mediterranean Games
Competitors at the 2009 Mediterranean Games
Mediterranean Games medalists in wrestling
European Wrestling Championships medalists